Equity capital is raised in many ways; the major types of equity capital are unlisted equity, listed equity and hybrids. Equity capital market practices traditionally advise on a full range of equity, debt equity-linked, hybrid, asset-backed, credit-linked and derivative products that are offered in capital markets.

An Equity Capital Market (ECM) is a market between "companies and financial institutions" that is aimed at earning money for the company. Examples of financial institutions involved include Goldman Sachs and Citigroup. The company gives information about their finances to the institution, and the institution helps the company increase their profits through "market transactions." Institutions providing ECM services may be involved in initial public offerings (IPO),convertible bonds, and other services involving equity. They may also raise money for a company merge or acquisition of another company. There was a peak in the amount of profits generated through ECM in 2006-2007, but profits took a dive following those years. It has been reported that ECM profits are beginning to normalize.

In corporate finance, Equity Capital Market is an investment banking activity consisting in advising companies, also referred to as issuers, to raise equity on capital markets. ECM consists in preparing the equity issues, from designing the equity story and marketing materials of the proposed transaction to placing the underlying equity securities to institutional and retail investors through an adequate marketing strategy. Equity securities placed by an ECM desk can range from common shares to convertible bonds into shares, the latter sometimes designed as Equity-Linked Capital Market.

References

Financial markets